Atomic Arena is a 1988 heavy metal album released by the Christian metal band Barren Cross. The album was produced by John Elefante of Kansas fame and his brother Dino. Its lyrical content deals with social issues such as suicide and abortion, and spiritual issues such as cults and the nature of God.

Track listing 
 "Imaginary Music" - 4:26
 "Killers of the Unborn" - 3:28 
 "In the Eye of the Fire" - 4:27 
 "Terrorist Child" - 3:30
 "Close to the Edge" - 4:55 
 "Dead Lock" - 4:18
 "Cultic Regimes" - 2:48
 "Heaven or Nothing" - 4:10
 "King of Kings" - 3:30 
 "Living Dead" - 6:50

Credits

Band
Mike Lee - lead vocals and acoustic guitar
Ray Parris - rhythm and lead guitar, acoustic guitars, background vocals
Steve Whitaker - drums, background vocals
Jim LaVerde - bass  guitar, taurus synthesizer pedals, background vocals

Additional musicians
Dino Elefante - additional vocals 
John Elefante - keyboards, additional vocals

References

1988 albums
Barren Cross albums